Vidiri may refer to:

Vidiri people, ethnic group in the Central African Republic and Sudan
Joeli Vidiri (born 1973), Fijian rugby union player